Abu Thaylah is a district in Qatar, located in the municipality of Umm Salal.

Etymology
"Abu" means father in English, and in this context is used as a prefix to signify a geographic feature. The second part, "thayla", is derived from a plant known locally as "al thail" which is found in great abundance around the area.

Infrastructure
In the late 1960s the government established an electrical substation here.

A large-scale government-sanctioned plant nursery was opened in Abu Thaylah in 2003. Plants grown in the nursery are used for research and also distributed to government ministries. The nursery covers an area of 2,500 sq meters.

References

Populated places in Umm Salal